William Clarke Quantrill (July 31, 1837 – June 6, 1865) was a Confederate guerrilla leader during the American Civil War.

Having endured a tempestuous childhood before later becoming a schoolteacher, Quantrill joined a group of bandits who roamed the Missouri and Kansas countryside to apprehend escaped slaves. Later, the group became Confederate soldiers, who were referred to as "Quantrill's Raiders". It was a pro-Confederate partisan ranger outfit that was best known for its often brutal guerrilla tactics. Also notable is that the group included the young Jesse James and his older brother Frank James.
 
Quantrill is often noted as influential in the minds of many bandits, outlaws and hired guns of the Old West as it was being settled. In May 1865, Quantrill was mortally wounded in combat by Union troops in Central Kentucky in one of the last engagements of the Civil War. He died of wounds in June.

Early life
William Quantrill was born at Canal Dover, Ohio, on July 31, 1837. His father was Thomas Henry Quantrill, formerly of Hagerstown, Maryland, and his mother, Caroline Cornelia Clark, was a native of Chambersburg, Pennsylvania. Quantrill was also the oldest of twelve children, four of whom died in infancy. By the time he was sixteen, Quantrill was teaching school in Ohio. In 1854, his abusive father died of tuberculosis, leaving the family with a huge financial debt. Quantrill's mother had to turn her home into a boarding house in order to survive. During this time, Quantrill helped support the family by continuing to work as a schoolteacher, but he left home a year later and headed to Mendota, Illinois. Here, Quantrill took up a job in the lumberyards, unloading timber from rail cars.

One night while working the late shift, he killed a man. Authorities briefly arrested him, but Quantrill claimed that he had acted in self-defense. Since there were no eyewitnesses and the victim was a stranger who knew no one in town, William was set free. Nevertheless, the police strongly urged him to leave Mendota. Quantrill continued his career as a teacher, moving to Fort Wayne, Indiana, in February 1856. Quantrill journeyed back home to Canal Dover that fall.

Quantrill spent the winter in his family's diminutive shack in the impoverished town, and he soon grew rather restless. At this time, many Ohioans were migrating to the Kansas Territory in search of cheap land and opportunity. This included Henry Torrey and Harmon Beeson, two local men hoping to build a large farm for their families out west. Although they mistrusted the 19-year-old William, his mother's pleadings persuaded them to let her son accompany them  in an effort to get him to turn his life around. The party of three departed in late February 1857. Torrey and Beeson agreed to pay for Quantrill's land in exchange for a couple of months' worth of work. They settled at Marais des Cygnes, but things did not go as well as planned. After about two months, Quantrill began to slack off when it came to working the land, and he spent most days wandering aimlessly about the wilderness with a rifle. A dispute arose over the claim, and he went to court with Torrey and Beeson. The court awarded the men what was owed to them, but Quantrill paid only half of what the court had mandated. Although his relationship with Beeson was never the same, Quantrill remained friends with Torrey.

Shortly afterwards, Quantrill accompanied a large group of hometown friends in their quest to start a settlement on Tuscarora Lake. However, neighbors soon began to notice Quantrill stealing goods out of other people's cabins and so they banished him from the community in January 1858. Soon thereafter, he signed on as a teamster with the U.S. Army expedition heading to Salt Lake City, Utah in the spring of 1858. Little is known of Quantrill's journey out west except that he excelled at the game of poker. He racked up piles of winnings by playing the game against his comrades at Fort Bridger but flushed it all on one hand the next day, leaving him dead broke. Quantrill then joined a group of Missouri ruffians and became somewhat of a drifter. The group helped protect Missouri farmers from the Jayhawkers for pay and slept wherever they could find lodging. Quantrill traveled back to Utah and then to Colorado but returned in less than a year to Lawrence, Kansas, in 1859 where he taught at a schoolhouse until it closed in 1860. He then took up with brigands and turned to cattle rustling and anything else that could earn him money. He also learned the profitability of capturing runaway slaves and devised plans to use free black men as bait for runaway slaves, whom he subsequently captured and returned to their masters in exchange for reward money.

Initially, before 1860, Quantrill appeared to oppose slavery. For instance, he wrote to his good friend W.W. Scott in January 1858 that the Lecompton Constitution was a "swindle" and that James H. Lane, a Northern sympathizer, was "as good a man as we have here". He also called the Democrats "the worst men we have for they are all rascals, for no one can be a democrat here without being one". However, in February 1860, Quantrill wrote a letter to his mother that expressed his views on the anti-slavery supporters. He told her that slavery was right and that he now detested Jim Lane. He said that the hanging of John Brown had been too good for him and that "the devil has got unlimited sway over this territory, and will hold it until we have a better set of man and society generally."

Guerrilla leader
In 1861, Quantrill went to Texas with the slaveholder Marcus Gill. There, they met Joel B. Mayes and joined the Cherokee Nations. Mayes was a half Scots-Irish and half Cherokee Confederate sympathizer and a war chief of the Cherokee Nations in Texas. He had moved from Georgia to the old Indian Territory in 1838. Mayes enlisted and served as a private in Company A of the 1st Cherokee Regiment in the Confederate army. It was Mayes who taught Quantrill guerrilla warfare tactics, the ambush fighting tactics used by the Native Americans, as well as camouflage and the tactic of the sneak attack. Quantrill, in the company of Mayes and the Cherokee Nations, joined with General Sterling Price and fought at the Battle of Wilson's Creek and Lexington in August and September 1861.

In the last days of September, Quantrill deserted General Price's army and went home to Blue Springs, Missouri, to form his own "army" of loyal men who had great belief in him and the Confederate cause, and they came to be known as "Quantrill's Raiders". By Christmas 1861, he had ten men who would follow him full-time into his pro-Confederate guerrilla organization: William Haller, George Todd, Joseph Gilcrist, Perry Hoy, John Little, James Little, Joseph Baughan, William H. Gregg, James A. Hendricks, and John W. Koger. Later in 1862, John Jarrett, John Brown (not to be confused with the abolitionist John Brown), Cole Younger, William T. "Bloody Bill" Anderson, and the James brothers would join Quantrill's army.

On March 7, 1862, Quantrill and his men overcame a small Union outpost at Aubry, Kansas and ransacked the town.

On March 11, 1862, Quantrill joined Confederate forces under Colonel John T. Hughes and took part in attack on Independence, Missouri. After what became known as the First Battle of Independence, the Confederate government decided to secure the loyalty of Quantrill by issuing him a "formal army commission" to the rank of captain.

On September 7, 1862, after midnight, Quantrill with 140 of his men captured Olathe, Kansas, where he surprised 125 Union soldiers, who were forced to surrender.

On October 5, 1862, Quantrill attacked and destroyed Shawneetown, Kansas, and Bill Anderson soon revisited and torched the rebuilding settlement.

On November 5, 1862, Quantrill joined Colonel Warner Lewis to stage an attack on Lamar, Missouri, where a company of the 8th Regiment Missouri Volunteer Cavalry protected a Union outpost. Warned about the attack, the Union soldiers were able to repel the raiders, who torched part of the town before they retreated.

Lawrence Massacre

The most significant event in Quantrill's guerrilla career took place on August 21, 1863. Lawrence had been seen for years as the stronghold of the antislavery forces in Kansas and as a base of operation for incursions into Missouri by Jayhawkers and pro-Union forces. It was also the home of James H. Lane, a senator known in Missouri for his staunch opposition to slavery and as a leader of the Jayhawkers.

During the weeks immediately preceding the raid, Union General Thomas Ewing, Jr., had ordered the detention of any civilians giving aid to Quantrill's Raiders. Several female relatives of the guerrillas had been imprisoned in a makeshift jail in Kansas City, Missouri. On August 14, the building collapsed, killing four young women and seriously injuring others.  Among the dead was Josephine Anderson, the sister of one of Quantrill's key guerrilla allies, Bill Anderson. Another of Anderson's sisters, Mary, was permanently crippled in the collapse. Quantrill's men believed that the collapse was deliberate, which fanned them into a fury.

Some historians have suggested that Quantrill had actually planned to raid Lawrence before the building's collapse, in retaliation for earlier Jayhawker attacks as well as the burning of Osceola, Missouri.

Early in the morning of August 21, Quantrill descended from Mount Oread and attacked Lawrence at the head of a combined force of as many as 450 guerrilla fighters. Lane, a prime target of the raid, managed to escape through a cornfield in his nightshirt, but the guerrillas, on Quantrill's orders, killed around 150 men and boys who were able to carry a rifle. When Quantrill's men rode out at 9 a.m., most of Lawrence's buildings were burning, including all but two businesses.

On August 25, in retaliation for the raid, General Ewing authorized General Order No. 11 (not to be confused with General Ulysses S. Grant's order of the same name). The edict ordered the depopulation of three and a half Missouri counties along the Kansas border with the exception of a few designated towns, which forced tens of thousands of civilians to abandon their homes. Union troops marched through behind them and burned buildings, torched planted fields, and shot down livestock to deprive the guerrillas of food, fodder and support. The area was so thoroughly devastated that it became known thereafter as the "Burnt District".

In early October, Quantrill and his men rode south to Texas, where they decided to pass the winter. On his way, on October 6, Quantrill chose to attack Fort Blair in Baxter Springs, Kansas, which resulted in the so-called Battle of Baxter Springs. After being repelled, Quantrill surprised and destroyed a Union relief column under General James G. Blunt, who escaped, but almost 100 Union soldiers were killed.

In Texas, on May 18, 1864, Quantrill's sympathizers  lynched Collin County Sheriff Captain James L. Read for shooting the Calhoun Brothers from Quantrill's force who had killed a farmer in Millwood, Texas.

Last years

While in Texas, Quantrill and his 400 men quarreled. His once-large band broke up into several smaller guerrilla companies. One was led by his lieutenant, "Bloody Bill" Anderson, and Quantrill joined it briefly in the fall of 1864 during a fight north of the Missouri River.

In the spring of 1865, now leading only a few dozen pro-confederates, Quantrill staged a series of raids in western Kentucky.  Confederate General Robert E. Lee surrendered to Ulysses Grant on April 9, and General Joseph E. Johnston surrendered most of the rest of the Confederate Army to General Sherman on April 26. On May 10, Quantrill and his band were caught in a Union ambush at Wakefield Farm. Unable to escape on account of a skittish horse, he was shot in the back and paralyzed from the chest down. The unit that successfully ambushed Quantrill and his followers was led by Edwin W. Terrell, a guerrilla hunter charged with finding and eliminating high-profile targets by General John M. Palmer, the commander of the District of Kentucky. The Union officials, Palmer and Governor Thomas E. Bramlette, did not wish to see Quantrill staging a repeat of his performance in Missouri in 1862–1863. He was brought by wagon to Louisville, Kentucky, and taken to the military prison hospital, on the north side of Broadway at 10th Street. He died from his wounds on June 6, 1865, at the age of 27.

Burial
Quantrill was buried in an unmarked grave, which is now marked, in what later became known as St. John's Cemetery in Louisville. A boyhood friend of Quantrill, the newspaper reporter William W. Scott, claimed to have dug up the Louisville grave in 1887 and to have brought Quantrill's remains back to Dover at the request of Quantrill's mother. The remains were supposedly buried in Dover in 1889, but Scott attempted to sell what he said were Quantrill's bones and so it is unknown if the remains he returned to Dover or buried in Dover were genuine. In the early 1990s, the Missouri division of the Sons of Confederate Veterans convinced the Kansas State Historical Society to negotiate with authorities in Dover, which led to three arm bones, two leg bones, and some hair, all of which were allegedly Quantrill's, being re-buried in 1992 at the Old Confederate Veteran's Home Cemetery in Higginsville, Missouri. As a result, there are grave markers for Quantrill in Louisville, Dover, and Higginsville.

Claims of survival
In August 1907, news articles appeared in Canada and the US that claimed that J.E. Duffy, a member of a Michigan cavalry troop that had dealt with Quantrill's raiders during the Civil War, met Quantrill at Quatsino Sound, on northern Vancouver Island, while he was investigating timber rights in the area. Duffy claimed to recognize the man, living under the name of John Sharp, as Quantrill. Duffy said that Sharp admitted he was Quantrill and discussed in detail raids in Kansas and elsewhere. Sharp claimed that he had survived the ambush in Kentucky but received a bayonet and bullet wound, making his way to South America where he lived some years in Chile. He returned to the US and worked as a cattleman in Fort Worth, Texas. He then moved to Oregon, acting as a cowpuncher and drover, before he reached British Columbia in the 1890s, where he worked in logging, trapping and finally as a mine caretaker at Coal Harbour at Quatsino.

Within some weeks after the news stories were published, two men came to British Columbia, travelling to Quatsino from Victoria, leaving Quatsino on a return voyage of a coastal steamer the next day. On that day, Sharp was found severely beaten and died several hours later without giving information about his attackers. The police were unable to solve the murder.

Another legend that has circulated claims that Quantrill may have escaped custody and fled to Arkansas, where he lived under the name of L.J. Crocker until his death in 1917.

Personal life
During the war, Quantrill met the 13-year-old Sarah Katherine King at her parents' farm in Blue Springs, Missouri. They never married, although she often visited and lived in camp with Quantrill and his men. At the time of his death, she was 17.

Legacy

Quantrill's actions remain controversial. Some Historians view him as an opportunistic, bloodthirsty outlaw; James M. McPherson, one of the most prominent experts on the American Civil War, calls him and Anderson "pathological killers" who "murdered and burned out Missouri Unionists". The historian Matthew Christopher Hulbert argues that Quantrill "ruled the bushwhacker pantheon" established by ex-Confederate officer and propagandist John Newman Edwards in the 1870s to provide Missouri with its own "irregular Lost Cause". Some of Quantrill's celebrity later rubbed off on other ex-Raiders, like John Jarrett, George and Oliver Shepherd, Jesse and Frank James, and Cole Younger, who went on after the war to apply Quantrill's hit-and-run tactics to bank and train robbery. The William Clarke Quantrill Society continues to celebrate Quantrill's life and deeds.

In fiction

Comics
 A Belgian comic series, Les Tuniques Bleues ("The Blue Coats", first printed in 1994), depicts Quantrill as twisted, even psychotic.
In the DC Comics 12-part miniseries The Kents (1997), Quantrill is depicted as a traitorous man who lives under a false name in 1856 Kansas, pretending to befriend abolitionists and then leading them into deathtraps.
Quantrill appears in two volumes of the Franco-Belgian comic series Blueberry, The Missouri Demons and Terror Over Kansas.

Film
 Dark Command (1940), in which John Wayne opposes former schoolteacher turned guerrilla fighter "William Cantrell" in the early days of the Civil War. William Cantrell is a thinly veiled portrayal of William Quantrill. Walter Pidgeon portrays "Cantrell"/Quantrill.
 Renegade Girl (1946) deals with tension between Unionists and Confederates in Missouri. Ray Corrigan plays Quantrill.
At the beginning of the film Fighting Man of the Plains (1949), starring Randolph Scott and Dale Robertson, Quantrill's Raiders are mentioned along with individual mentions of the more notorious members.
 Kansas Raiders (1950), Brian Donlevy (at age 49) portrayed Quantrill, in which Jesse James (played by Audie Murphy) falls under the influence of the guerilla leader.
 In Best of the Badmen (1951), Robert Ryan plays a Union officer who goes to Missouri after the Civil War to persuade the remnants of Quantrill's band to swear allegiance to the Union in return for a pardon. They are betrayed and he becomes their leader in a fight against corrupt law officers.
 In Red Mountain (1951), Alan Ladd plays a Confederate officer who joins and later becomes disillusioned with Quantrill, played by John Ireland.
 In Kansas Pacific (1953), Quantrill is the antagonist to Sterling Hayden's Federal character but is portrayed as trying to delay the building of the railroad before the war breaks out and is only captured at the end. 
In The Stranger Wore a Gun (1953), a former Quantrill Raider becomes bank robber until his old comrades catch up with him.
 Woman They Almost Lynched (1953) features Quantrill's wife Kate as a female gunslinger.
 Quantrill's Raiders (1958), focuses on the raid on Lawrence. Leo Gordon plays Quantrill. 
 Young Jesse James (1960) also depicts Quantrill's influence on Jesse James.
 In Arizona Raiders (1965), Audie Murphy plays an ex-Quantrill Raider who is assigned the task of tracking down his former comrades.
 In Bandolero! (1968), Dean Martin plays Dee Bishop, a former Quantrill Raider who admits to participating in the attack on Lawrence. His brother Mace, played by James Stewart, was a member of the Union Army under General William Tecumseh Sherman.
 In The Outlaw Josey Wales (1976), ferry operator Sim Carstairs states to Josey Wales, "Bill Quantrill used this ferry all the time. Good friend of mine."
 In The Legend of the Golden Gun (1979), two men attempt to track down and kill Quantrill.
 Lawrence: Free State Fortress (1998) depicts the attack on Lawrence.
 In True Grit (1969) and True Grit (2010), Le Boeuf denounces Quantrill, whom Rooster Cogburn served with, as a killer of women and children.
 In Ride with the Devil (1999) protagonists ride with “Black John Ambrose” who is a loose portrayal of "Bloody Bill" Anderson and later join with Quantrill for the raid on Kansas. Quantrill, Anderson, and most Raiders are portrayed as blood thirsty and murderous.

Literature
 Quantrill is a major character in Wildwood Boys (2000), James Carlos Blake's biographical novel of Bloody Bill Anderson.
 In the novel The Rebel Outlaw: Josey Wales (republished as Gone to Texas in later editions), by Asa (aka Forrest) Carter, Josey Wales is a former member of a Confederate raiding party led by "Bloody Bill" Anderson. The book is the basis of the Clint Eastwood film The Outlaw Josey Wales (1976).
In Bradley Denton's alternate history tale "The Territory" (1992), Samuel Clemens joins Quantrill's Raiders and is with them when they attack Lawrence, Kansas. It was nominated for a Hugo, Nebula and World Fantasy Award for best novella.
 Frank Gruber's article "Quantrell's Flag" (1940), for Adventure Magazine (March through May, 1940), was published as a book titled Quantrell's Raiders (Ace Original, 954366 bound with Rebel Road).
 In Charles Portis' novel True Grit, and the 1969 and 2010 film versions thereof, Rooster Cogburn boasts of being a former member of Quantrill's Raiders, and LaBoeuf excoriates him for being part of the "border gang" that murdered men and children alike during the raid on Lawrence.
 The novel Woe To Live On (1987) by Daniel Woodrell was filmed as Ride With The Devil (1999) by Ang Lee. The film features a harrowing recreation of the Lawrence Massacre and is notable for its overall authenticity. Quantrill, played by John Ales, makes brief appearances.
In the novelization of the 1999 film Wild Wild West by Bruce Bethke, former Confederate General "Bloodbath" McGrath (played by Ted Levine) reflects on the fates of his several friends from the war, including Quantrill, Henry Wirz, and John Singleton Mosby.
In the novel Lincoln's Sword (2010) by Debra Doyle and James D. Macdonald the raid on Lawrence, Kansas, is told from the point of view of Cole Younger.
In the story Hewn in Pieces for the Lord  by John J. Miller – published in Drakas!, an anthology of stories set in S. M. Stirling's alternate history series  The Domination – Quantrill managed to escape after the fall of the Confederacy, get to the slave-holding Draka society in Africa, and join its ruthless Security Directorate, where he tangles with the rebellious Madhi in Sudan.
In Magnus Chase, Hammer of Thor by Rick Riodian, William Quantrill is briefly mentioned as “Mother William” on page 80
In the novel Shadow of the Outlaw: Quantrill's Initiation (2021) by Mason Stone - Historical fiction summarizing Quantrill's adult life.

Plays
 He is depicted in Robert Schenkkan's series of one-act plays, The Kentucky Cycle.

Music
 Woody Guthrie's ballad "Belle Starr" identifies Quantrill as one of Starr's eight lovers, along with both of the James brothers.
 Ry Cooder’s song ‘’Wildwood Boys” has the lyrics “High riding rebs from Missouri, Fought for the Gray and Quantril, Caught up in the battle and the fury, Back when just livin’ was hell”. Soundtrack from the film The Long Riders.

Television
The actor Bruce Bennett played Quantrill in a 1954 episode of the syndicated television series Stories of the Century, starring Jim Davis as the railroad detective and narrator, Matt Clark.
 Gunsmoke'''s first television season episode "Reunion '78"  features a showdown between cowboy Jerry Shand, who has just arrived in Dodge City, and long-time resident Andy Cully, hardware dealer, who was one of Quantrill's Raiders. Shand hails from Lawrence, Kansas, and has an old score to settle.
 Have Gun—Will Travel's episode "The Teacher" (1958) mentions Quantrill’s Raiders.  A schoolteacher wants to teach the school children about both sides of the Civil War and the people which hail from the North don’t like it.
 The Rough Riders episode entitled "The Plot to Assassinate President Johnson" (1959), as the title suggests, involves Quantrill in a plot to assassinate President Andrew Johnson.
 The TV series Hondo featured both Quantrill and Jesse James in the episode "Hondo and the Judas" (1967).
 The Secret Adventures of Jules Verne episode, "The Ballad of Steeley Joe" (2000), depicts both Jesse James and William Quantrill.
 The USA Network's television show Psych, in an episode entitled "Weekend Warriors", featured a Civil War re-enactment that included William Quantrill. The episode spoke about Quantrill's actions in Lawrence, but the reenactment featured his death at the hands of a fictional nurse, Jenny Winslow, whose family was killed at Lawrence.
 Quantrill's Lawrence Massacre of 1863 is depicted in Steven Spielberg's mini-series Into the West (2005)

Notes

References
 The American West, Vol. 10, American West Pub. Co., 1973, pp. 13 to 17.
 Banasik, Michael E., Cavalires of the bush: Quantrill and his men, Press of the Camp Pope Bookshop, 2003.
 Connelley, William Elsey, Quantrill and the border wars, The Torch Press, 1910 (reprinted by Kessinger Publishing, 2004).
 Dupuy, Trevor N., Johnson, Curt, and Bongard, David L., Harper Encyclopedia of Military Biography, Castle Books, 1992, 1st Ed., .
 Edwards, John N., Noted Guerillas: The Warfare of the Border, St. Louis: Bryan, Brand, & Company, 1877.
Eicher, David J., The Longest Night: A Military History of the Civil War, Simon & Schuster, 2001, .
 Gilmore, Donald L., Civil War on the Missouri-Kansas border, Pelican Publishing, 2006.
 Hulbert, Matthew Christopher. The Ghosts of Guerrilla Memory: How Civil War Bushwhackers Became Gunslingers in the American West. Athens: University of Georgia Press, 2016. .
 Leslie, Edward E., The Devil Knows How to Ride: The True Story of William Clarke Quantrill and his Confederate Raiders, Da Capo Press, 1996, .
 McKelvie, B.A., Magic, Murder & Mystery, Cowichan Leader Ltd. (printer), 1966, pp. 55 to 62
 Mills, Charles, Treasure Legends Of The Civil War, Apple Cheeks Press, 2001, .
 Schultz, Duane, Quantrill's war: the life and times of William Clarke Quantrill, 1837-1865, St. Martin's Press, 1997.
Wellman, Paul I., A Dynasty of Western Outlaws, University of Nebraska Press, 1986, .

Further reading

 Castel, Albert E., William Clarke Quantrill, University of Oklahoma Press, 1999, .
 Geiger, Mark W. Financial Fraud and Guerrilla Violence in Missouri's Civil War, 1861-1865, Yale University Press, 2010,  
 Hulbert, Matthew Christopher The Ghosts of Guerrilla Memory: How Civil War Bushwhackers Became Gunslingers in the American West. Athens: University of Georgia Press, 2016. .
 Schultz, Duane, Quantrill's War: The Life and Times of William Clarke Quantrill, 1837–1865, Macmillan Publishing, 1997, .

Historiography
 Crouch, Barry A. "A 'Fiend in Human Shape?' William Clarke Quantrill and his Biographers", Kansas History'' (1999) 22#2 pp 142–156 analyzes the highly polarized historiography

External links
 William Clark Quantrill Society
 Official website for the Family of Frank & Jesse James: Stray Leaves, A James Family in America Since 1650
 T.J. Stiles, Jesse James: Last Rebel of the Civil War
 Guerrilla raiders in an 1862 Harper's Weekly story, with illustration
 Quantrill's Guerrillas Members In The Civil War
 Quantrill flag at Kansas Museum of History
 "Guerilla Warfare in Kentucky" — Article by Civil War historian/author Bryan S. Bush
  (1923 book of reminiscences by Harrison Trow)

1837 births
1865 deaths
Confederate States Army officers
Bushwhackers
Bleeding Kansas
Northern-born Confederates
People of Missouri in the American Civil War
People of Kansas in the American Civil War
People of Kentucky in the American Civil War
People of the Utah War
People from Dover, Ohio
Deaths by firearm in Kentucky
American proslavery activists
Warlords
American mass murderers
War criminals